What's My Name is the 20th studio album by English singer-songwriter Ringo Starr. It was released on 25 October 2019 through Roccabella and Universal Music Enterprises. The album was again recorded at Roccabella West, Starr's home studio, and features collaborations with Joe Walsh, Benmont Tench, Edgar Winter, Steve Lukather, Richard Page, and Warren Ham. It also includes a cover of John Lennon's "Grow Old with Me", on which Starr invited Paul McCartney to sing and play bass guitar, and a solo version by Starr of "Money (That's What I Want)", a Motown song previously recorded by the Beatles. Starr has stated that What's My Name will likely be his last full-length album, with plans to release EPs in the future instead.

Writing and recording
Several of the tracks were written with previous collaborators based around comments Starr has made. "What's My Name", the title track and first single, was composed by Colin Hay, and comes from a chant Starr has used in concert. Starr co-wrote "Gotta Get Up to Get Down" with his brother-in-law Joe Walsh after a comment Starr made at a dinner they had with Klaus Voormann, while Starr composed "Thank God for Music" with Sam Hollander, who then wrote "Better Days" on his own based on an interview Starr gave to Rolling Stone. The song "Magic" is a collaboration with Steve Lukather, whom Starr has worked with on his two previous studio albums.

The album was recorded in Los Angeles at Starr's home studio, Roccabella West, with Starr saying that he did not "want to be in an old-fashioned recording studio anymore" and that he had "had enough of the big glass wall and the separation", saying recording at his home has been good for himself "and the music". Starr decided to record a cover of John Lennon's "Grow Old with Me", a song recorded during the Bermuda sessions for Lennon's Double Fantasy (1980), after meeting producer Jack Douglas by chance. Douglas, who had produced Double Fantasy, asked Starr if he had listened to the Bermuda recording sessions, and supplied them to Starr when he mentioned he had not. Starr was impressed by the song, and decided to record his own version. Starr asked Paul McCartney to perform on the track. The song's string arrangement incorporates a motif from the George Harrison-penned song "Here Comes the Sun", giving all four Beatles a presence on the recording. Starr's cover of "Money (That's What I Want)", recorded before the "Grow Old with Me" cover was envisioned, was an attempt to create a modern version different from the Motown original and the Beatles' 1963 cover. The recording incorporates the use of autotune on Starr's voice.

Release and reception 

What's My Name was released on 25 October 2019. It received mixed reviews upon its release. NMEs Rhian Daly commented that the album "dares you to continue listening, to see if you can make it through its first song without spontaneously combusting from second-hand embarrassment, a spectral groan of “Grandaaad” escaping from your ashes as they sizzle and singe." AllMusic's Stephen Thomas Erlewine commented that "the spirits are sunny and the songs tuneful, it's hard not to find What's My Name ingratiating, even though much of the album is so good-intentioned, it's silly."

In a positive review, Mark Smotroff of Audiophile Review felt that What's My Name described the record as "a lot of fun to listen to, one of the hallmarks of the best Ringo records", praising the album's "celebratory party-like modern indie rock flavor". Smotroff, similar to Rolling Stone reviewer Brenna Ehrlich, praised the record's ensemble of veteran performers "comfortab[ly] doing what they do together", and being "the sound of a klatch of seasoned performers letting loose". Ehrlich felt the fun nature of the album was essential to how a quality Ringo Starr record should be. Several reviewers such as NME cited Starr's cover of "Grow Old with Me" to be the highlight of the record.

Track listing

Personnel 
 Ringo Starr – lead vocals, drums, percussion
 Joe Walsh –  guitar ( tr. 1, 3 ), backing vocals, rapping (1)
 Colin Hay – guitar and backing vocals (10)
 David A. Stewart – guitar ( tr. 2
 Steve Lukather – guitar( tr.4 )
 Pete Min, Steve Dudas - guitar
 Paul McCartney – bass guitar and backing vocals (3)
 John Pierce – bass guitar
 Kaveh Rastegar - bass guitar
 Nathan East – bass guitar
 Edgar Winter – Clavinet, Synthesizer, Back vocals (tr. 1)
 Benmont Tench – Clavinet ( tr.2 ), organ ( tr. 7 ), organ & piano ( tr. 9 )
Piano – Grant Michaels, Jim Cox
 Organ – Peter Levin
 Harmonica – Warren Ham
 Bruce Sugar – Synthesizer, Horns, Piano, Organ, Voice
 Jack Douglas – String arrangement (3)
 Accordion – Allison Lovejoy
 Kari Kimmel, Richard Page, Warren Ham, Windy Wagner – backing vocals (4)

Charts

References

External links

2019 albums
Albums recorded in a home studio
Ringo Starr albums
Albums produced by Ringo Starr